The League of Electronic Musical Urban Robots, or LEMUR, was a Brooklyn-based group of artists and technologists developing robotic musical instruments. Founded in 2000 by musician and engineer Eric Singer, LEMUR's philosophy was to build robotic instruments that play themselves. In LEMUR designs, the robots are the instruments.

LEMUR was supported in part by grants from the Rockefeller Foundation, the New York State Council on the Arts (NYSCA), the Greenwall Foundation, the Jerome Foundation, Arts International and Harvestworks Digital Media Arts Center.

Other LEMUR members included Jeff Feddersen, Milena Iossifova, Bil Bowen, R. Luke DuBois, Leif Krinkle, Roberto Osorio-Goenaga, Bob Huott, Ajay Kapur, Rocío Barcia, Kevin Larke, David Bianciardi, Michelle Cherian, Michael Hearst, Brendan J. FitzGerald, Chad Redmon, Kate Chapman and Marius Schebella. LEMUR composers included Joshua Fried, Mari Kimura, Brendan Adamson, and Lee Ranaldo and They Might Be Giants.

LEMUR Instruments
Guitarbot
modBots

External links

lemurbots.org

Music organizations based in the United States
Rockefeller Foundation